Jacob Abraham Maryson (1866–1941) was a Jewish–American anarchist, doctor, essayist and Yiddish translator. Maryson was among the few Pioneers of Liberty who could write in English. He was among the Pioneers who launched the Varhayt in 1889, the first American anarchist periodical in Yiddish. He was the second editor of Fraye Arbeter Shtime and during the paper's hiatus in the late 1890s, he assisted in the cultural and literary journal Di Fraye Gezelshaft. Beginning in 1911, he edited the anarchist periodical Dos Fraye Vort. Maryson also wrote for multiple other publications.

He organized the Kropotkin Literary Society to print Yiddish translations of European thinkers. Maryson handled some of the group's most challenging translations, including Marx's Das Kapital, Stirner's The Ego and His Own, and Thoreau's Civil Disobedience. He also translated John Stuart Mill's On Liberty.<ref>Allentuck, Marcia. "An Unremarked Yiddish Translation of Mill's On Liberty." The Mill News Letter 5:1 (Fall 1969): 10.</ref> Maryson later wrote The Principles of Anarchism in 1935.

His wife's name was Katherina.

 Works 

 The Principles of Anarchism (1934, trans. 1935)
 Physiology (1918–1925; four volumes)
 Mother and Child: Practical Advice for Mothers on How to Take Care of Themselves During Pregnancy and How to Rear Children (1912)
 Anarchism and Political Activity'' (1907)

References 

1866 births
1941 deaths
American anarchists
American essayists
American physicians
American translators
Jewish anarchists
Jewish physicians
Jewish translators
Translators to Yiddish